This article is a list of notable streets in Thessaloniki, Greece:

Antheon (Georgiou Papandreou) Street
Andrea Papandreou Avenue
Angelaki Street
Agias Sofias Street
Agiou Dimitriou Street
Botsari Street
Edessis Street
Ionos Dragoumi Street
Stefanou Dragoumi Street
Delfon Street
D'Espèrey Street, named after Louis Franchet d'Espèrey
Ethnikis Amynis Street (National Defence)
Egnatia Street
Ermou Street (Thessaloniki)
Heptapyrgiou Street
Iktinou Street
Kapodistria Street
Kaftanzoglou Street
Kassandrou Street
Karolou Diehl Street, named after Charles Diehl
Karamanli Street
Kastron Street
Koromila Street, named after Lambros Koromilas
Korai Street
Lambraki Street, named after Grigoris Lambrakis
Maria Callas Street
Mackenzie King Street
Megas Alexandros Avenue
25 Martiou Street
26 Oktovriou Street
Mitropoleos Street
Monastiriou Street
Nikis Avenue
Olympiados Street
Papafi Street, named after Ioannis Papafis
Pavlou Mela Street
Passalidi Street
Papanastasiou Street
Philippou Street
Petrou Syndika Street
Selefkou Street
Stratou Avenue
Sofouli Street, named after Themistoklis Sofoulis
Svolou Street
Tsimiski Street
Valaoritou Street
Velisariou Street, named after Belisarius
Varonou Hirsch Street, named after Maurice de Hirsch
Vasilissis Olgas Avenue, named after Queen Olga of Greece
Vasileos Georgiou Avenue
Vasileos Irakleiou Street
Venizelou Street
Voulgari Street

Thessaloniki
 
Thessaloniki